Anchorage Patch is a small, isolated shoal, the least depth of water over it being , lying within Davis Anchorage, about  northwest of the Torckler Rocks. The shoal was positioned by d'A. T. Gale, an Australian National Antarctic Research Expeditions surveyor aboard the Thala Dan in 1961.

References 

Barrier islands of Antarctica
Islands of Princess Elizabeth Land